Harpalus hospes is a species of ground beetle native to Europe, where it can be found in such countries as Austria, Bulgaria,  Czech Republic, Greece, Hungary, Moldova, Romania, Slovakia, Slovenia, Ukraine and southern part of Russia. It is also found in such Asian countries as Armenia, Georgia, Iran, Turkey and Uzbekistan.

References

External links
Harpalus hospes on Zin.ru
Harpalus hospes on Trechinae.org
Harpalus hospes on Carabidae of Romania

hospes
Beetles of Asia
Beetles of Europe
Beetles described in 1818